Denise Pimpini (born October 11, 1995 in Rivoli, Piedmont, Italy) is an Italian curler.

Pimpini plays second for Diana Gaspari. The team qualified for the 2017 World Women's Curling Championship, finishing with a last-place 2-10 round robin record. Pimpini is right-handed.

References

1995 births
Living people
Italian female curlers
People from Rivoli, Piedmont
Curlers at the 2012 Winter Youth Olympics
Sportspeople from the Metropolitan City of Turin
21st-century Italian women